Juan Antonio Larrañaga Gurruchaga (alt.spelling Ion Andoni; born 3 July 1958) is a Spanish retired footballer who played as a defender.

Club career
Larrañaga was born in Azpeitia, Gipuzkoa, Basque Country. He started playing as a defensive midfielder, being signed by Real Sociedad in 1977 from local CD Lagun Onak. In January 1980 he made his first-team debut in the Copa del Rey, against Navarre neighbours Peña Sport FC.

Although he featured sparingly in the 1980–81 season, as Real won the first of their two consecutive La Liga titles, Larrañaga did take the field in the decisive draw at Sporting de Gijón in the last round, and featured in all the matches the following campaign whilst adding two goals. From 1986 to 1992, he only missed a total of two games; after manager John Toshack was appointed, he began playing as a sweeper. On 1 October 2021, his record of 202 consecutive Spanish top tier appearances was eclipsed by Athletic Bilbao forward Iñaki Williams in a match against Deportivo Alavés.

Larrañaga retired at 36 at the end of 1993–94, having made 460 top-flight appearances (589 overall, only behind teammate Alberto Górriz in the club's record books). He was the only member of the league-winning sides to have played at both of the club's grounds: Atotxa and Anoeta.

International career
Larrañaga won one cap for Spain, playing the entire 1–2 friendly defeat to Czechoslovakia on 24 February 1988, in Málaga. He also appeared four times for the under-21 team.

Post-retirement
After retiring, Larrañaga took up coaching, but only in the lower leagues (for six years). He also appeared as a commentator for ETB 1, which lasted until the end of the 2005–06 season.

From 2006 to 2008, Larrañaga served as the youth coordinator of his only professional club, being fired at the end of the second division campaign.

Honours
Real Sociedad
La Liga: 1980–81, 1981–82
Copa del Rey: 1986–87
Supercopa de España: 1982

Individual
Don Balón Award – Best Spanish Player: 1987–88

See also
List of La Liga players (400+ appearances)
List of one-club men in association football

References

External links

1958 births
Living people
People from Azpeitia
Sportspeople from Gipuzkoa
Spanish footballers
Footballers from the Basque Country (autonomous community)
Association football defenders
Association football midfielders
Association football utility players
La Liga players
Tercera División players
Real Sociedad B footballers
Real Sociedad footballers
Spain under-21 international footballers
Spain under-23 international footballers
Spain international footballers
Basque Country international footballers
Real Sociedad non-playing staff